Amir Hashemi-Moghaddam (born 3 June 1966) is a former Iranian football player. He resides in Beuningen, Netherlands.

Hashemi started his career in his native, Iran, with Niroye Zamini and Esteghlal. Hashemi played 14 times for the Iran national football team against Poland, Russia, Angola, Japan, S. Korea, Qatar, Thailand and some other teams. He finished his playing career in the Eredivisie, Netherlands' top flight. Recently Amir has finished his academic Football Trainer Schooling by KNVB (Royal Dutch Football Federation). 
He is an 'UEFA "A" licensed trainer coach.

On 19 September 2014 he became the coach of AVW' 66. And on 20 May 2016 he became the head coach of NEC Nijmegen .

He is studying now football teacher/instructor education by KNVB (Royal Dutch Football Federation) to become a FIFA football instructor/teacher.

Hashemi is an official Intermediary by  KNVB and is since 2013 manager of Iran National Team football player Alireza Jahanbakhsh, who played for NEC Nijmegen en since 2015 by AZ Alkmaar Dutch premier league team Eredivisie.

External links
 Amir Hashemi interview with Burak Zihni (Gazete Damga) 
 Amir Hashemi new head coach sc N.E.C 
  
 Interview With Amir Hashemi 
 Hashemi new trainer coach of Lunteren
 Iraniër Hashemi nieuwe trainer Lunteren. in nujij 

1966 births
Living people
People from Tehran
Iranian footballers
Iran international footballers
Association football forwards
Nemzeti Bajnokság I players
Esteghlal F.C. players
Shamoushak Noshahr players
Niroye Zamini players
Torquay United F.C. players
Vasas SC players
San Francisco Bay Blackhawks players
Iranian expatriate footballers
Expatriate footballers in England
Expatriate footballers in Hungary
Expatriate soccer players in the United States
De Treffers players